The Ministry of Energy, Northern Development and Mines (MENDM) was the ministry responsible for developing a safe, reliable and affordable energy supply across the province, overseeing Ontario’s mineral sector and promoting northern economic and community development. The ministry's head office is located in Sudbury. The last Minister of Northern Development and Mines was Hon. Greg Rickford. The Ministry's programs also include the Northern Ontario Heritage Fund, and the creation and funding of local services boards to provide essential services in remote Northern Ontario communities which are not served by incorporated municipal governments.

In 2021, Premier Doug Ford separated the Ministry of Energy, Northern Development and Mines into the Ministry of Energy and the Ministry of Northern Development, Mines, Natural Resources and Forestry, by merging the  ministry (excluding Energy, which was made into its own portfolio) with the Ministry of Natural Resources and Forestry.

History
 1842 - Geological Survey of Canada formed by the Province of Canada
 1846 - Commissioner of Crown Lands (Province of Canada) assumed control for mines and mining.
 1867 - Responsibility for mines and mining transferred to the Ontario Commissioner of Crown Lands. The Montreal-based Geological Survey of Canada became part of the new federal government and moved to Ottawa in 1881.
 1890 - Royal Commission on Ontario's Mineral Resources (Chairman, John M. Charlton)
 1891 - Ontario Bureau of Mines established with Alexander Blue as its first director.
 1905 – The first cabinet minister from Northern Ontario, Sudbury's Frank Cochrane, is appointed. Cochrane serves as minister of the new Department of Lands, Forests and Mines until 1911.
 1912 – The Department creates a Northern Development Branch to further support growth in the North. In 1926, this branch becomes the Department of Northern Development.
 1930s – The Department of Northern Development merges with the Department of Highways. Its purpose: to build and maintain roads and bridges in Northern Ontario.
 1970 – The government creates a new Department of Mines and Northern Affairs in response to northerners' concerns about the lack of access to provincial government information. Twenty-four Northern Affairs offices in the region bring the Ontario government to northerners. This department changes name and responsibilities throughout the 1970s and early 1980s due to government restructuring.
 1985 – The government creates a new Ministry of Northern Affairs and Mines. Later that year, the name becomes the Ministry of Northern Development and Mines. The change emphasizes the province's commitment to greater social and economic development in the north.
 1990 – The ministry headquarters are re-located to two new buildings in Sudbury.
 2009 – The realignment of forestry from the Ministry of Natural Resources to the Ministry of Northern Development and Mines is announced reflecting the importance of forestry to many northern and rural communities. The renamed Ministry of Northern Development, Mines and Forestry now leads the business and economic aspects of forestry, including industrial strategy, forest sector competitiveness programs, softwood lumber and wood allocation, pricing and licensing.
 2011 – Forestry is once again allocated back to the Ministry of Natural Resources and the name shortened to its original 'Ministry of Northern Development and Mines'. Honourable Minister Rick Bartolucci, former Minister of Community Safety and Correctional services, is appointed Minister of Northern Development and Mines on October 20.
 2013 - Premier Kathleen Wynne appoints Michael Gravelle as Minister of Northern Development and Mines, on February 11.
 2018 - Premier Doug Ford appoints Greg Rickford as Minister of Northern Development and Mines, on June 29.
2019 - Premier Doug Ford renames the Ministry to Ministry of Energy, Northern Development and Mines.
2021 - Premier Doug Ford separates the Ministry to Ministry of Energy and Ministry of Natural Resources & Forestry, Northern Development and Mines

List of Ministers

1867–1970

1970 to present

Ministry Agencies 

 Council of The Association of Professional Geoscientists of Ontario 
 Independent Electricity System Operator
 Northern Ontario Heritage Fund Corporation 
 Ontario Energy Board
 Ontario Power Generation

OBM Progress Medal 

The OBM Progress Medal was given out by the Ontario Bureau of Mines and the Ministry of Northern Development and Mines in 1991 to celebrate 100 years of progress. Featuring a Trillium grandiflorum laid over a Pickaxe, the Medal weighs 17 grams.

References

External links 
 Ministry of Northern Development and Mines website
 History of Ontario Mining - http://www.republicofmining.com/2010/07/23/brief-history-of-ontario-mining

Energy, Northern Development and Mines
Ontario
Politics of Northern Ontario
Organizations based in Greater Sudbury
Subnational mining ministries